Fauna in the Czech Republic covers a wide variety of animal species.

Some species (especially endangered ones) are bred in reserves. Among the rare animals are, for example, eagles, ospreys, bustards, storks, etc.

Number of species in the Czech Republic
Approximate number of animal species in the Czech Republic is about 40 000 species.

 Protozoa - yes (worldwide ~ 31 000)
 Porifera - yes
 Cnidaria / Hydrozoa - 4
 Platyhelminthes
 Platyhelminthes / Catenulida, Macrostomida & Neorhabdocoela - 18
 Platyhelminthes / Tricladida	- 16
 Nemertea - 1
 Rotifera - probably 500
 Gastrotricha - 24
 Nematoda - from 501 to 5000 ?
 molluscs Mollusca - 247 in the wild, and at least 11 species in greenhouses. See List of non-marine molluscs of the Czech Republic
 Annelida - probably 220 including Slovakia
 Annelida / Aeolosomata & Oligochaeta (water species) - 81
 Annelida / leeches Hirudinea - 19. See List of leeches of the Czech Republic
 Annelida / Lumbricidae - 46
 Nematomorpha - few
 Acanthocephala - yes
 Tardigrada - 100
 spiders Araneae - 849 - see 
 scorpions Scorpiones - 1
 Pseudoscorpionida - 25
 Opilionida - 31 - see 
 Acarina
 Acarina / Mesostigmata - yes
 Acarina / Ixodides - 22
 Acarina / Prostigmata - 10
 Acarina / Eriophyoidea - yes
 Acarina (water) - 432
 Acarina / Oribatida - 548
 crustaceans Crustacea
 Crustacea / Anostraca - 5
 Crustacea / Notostraca - 2
 Crustacea / Spinicaudata - 4
 Crustacea / Cladocera - 105
 Crustacea / Ostracoda - 74
 Crustacea / Copepoda - 82
 Crustacea / Isopoda / Oniscidea - 52
 Crustacea / Isopoda (water) - 2
 Crustacea / Amphipoda - 8
 Crustacea / Decapoda - 6
 Chilopoda - 67
 Diplopoda - 65
 Protura - 32
 Collembola - probably 400
 Campodeina and Japygina - 10
 insect Insecta
 Zygentoma - 4
 Ephemeroptera - 97
 Odonata - 70
 Plecoptera - 80
 Blattodea - 5
 Mantodea - 1
 Ensifera and Caelifera - 93
 Dermaptera - 6
 Psocoptera - 70
 Thysanoptera - 230
 Heteroptera (land species) - 790
 Heteroptera (water species) - 60
 Auchenorrhyncha - 533
 Sternorrhyncha / Psyllinea - 116
 Sternorrhyncha / Aleyrodinea - 20
 Sternorrhyncha / Aphidinea - 689
 Sternorrhyncha / Coccinea - 140
 Trichoptera - 239
 Mecoptera - 9
 Neuroptera (land species) - 82
 Neuroptera (water species) - 3
 Raphidioptera - 10
 Megaloptera - 3
 Lepidoptera - 3200 - see List of Lepidoptera of the Czech Republic
 Lepidoptera (water species) - 6
 Diptera - 6500 including Slovakia
 Hymenoptera - ?

vertebrates - altogether probably 550 species
 Cyclostomata - 3
 fishes - probably 65 - see :cs:seznam ryb v Česku
 amphibians - about 20
 reptiles - about 12 see List of herpetofauna of the Czech Republic
 birds - 415 - see List of birds of the Czech Republic
 mammals - about 100 - see List of mammals of the Czech Republic, :cs:seznam netopýrů v Česku

See also
List of mammals of the Czech Republic
List of birds of the Czech Republic
List of leeches of the Czech Republic
List of non-marine molluscs of the Czech Republic
List of Lepidoptera of the Czech Republic
List of herpetofauna of the Czech Republic

References

 Optarný E. (1999) Zoogeografie. - Univerzita Palackého v Olomouci, Olomouc, 191 pp.,  (in Czech)

External links
 checklists at BioLib https://www.biolib.cz/cz/checklistsspec
 Šefrová H. & Laštůvka Z. (2005) Catalogue of alien animal species in the Czech Republic. - Acta univ. agric. et silvic. Mendel. Brun., Brno, 53(4): 151-170. https://web.archive.org/web/20070930072436/http://www.sefrova.com/publication/sefrova_lastuvka_04.pdf